The Sith are an organization and a race affiliated with the Dark Side in the Star Wars universe.

Sith may also refer to:

Folklore
Sìth, Scottish Gaelic semi-deities, spirits and fairies
Daoine Sìth or Aos Sí, Scottish fairies
Baobhan sith, a spirit vampire, and the Leanan sídhe, a Manx counterpart
Bean sith, more commonly known under the Anglicised spelling "banshee"
Cat Sìth, a Scottish fairy cat
Cu Sìth, a spirit dog sometimes known as a mound dog who haunts the barrow mounds
Sith , an angel of an hour (6 to 7 o'clock), or a regent ruling a planet. This is an obscure angel mentioned in A Dictionary of Angels: Including the Fallen Ones by Gustav Davidson.

Star Wars
Star Wars: Episode III – Revenge of the Sith, a 2005 American space opera film written and directed by George Lucas

Other uses
Shalom in the Home, a reality TV show by the TLC Network
SITh, static induction thyristor
A flying hornet-like monster in Edgar Rice Burroughs' Barsoom series of novels
 Sith, used in Terry Goodkind's fantasy series The Sword of Truth as Mord-Sith, women who are raised from young girls and taught in the ways of pain and torture
Commander Sith, a fictional character in Ghost Trick: Phantom Detective
 A continent mentioned in The Left Hand of Darkness by Ursula K. Le Guin

See also
Sikh, an adherent of Sikhism
Cait Sith, a character in Final Fantasy VII
Staten Island Technical High School, a specialized high school in New York City